Chantal Robin-Rodrigo (born 4 August 1948 in Aix-en-Provence, Bouches-du-Rhône) was a member of the National Assembly of France.   She represented the Hautes-Pyrénées department, and is a member of the Radical Party of the Left. She is of Spanish origin.

References

1948 births
Living people
People from Aix-en-Provence
French people of Spanish descent
Radical Party of the Left politicians
Politicians from Provence-Alpes-Côte d'Azur
Women members of the National Assembly (France)
Deputies of the 12th National Assembly of the French Fifth Republic
Deputies of the 13th National Assembly of the French Fifth Republic
21st-century French women politicians